Changin' Tires on the Road to Ruin is a 14-song B-sides/rarities compilation album from Superdrag released by Arena Rock Recording Co. in 2007.

Track listing
All tracks by John Davis

"Here We Come" - 2:15*
(8-Track Demo, Bearsville, NY, February 1997)
"She Says" - 3:42†
(8-Track Demo, Bearsville, NY, February 1997)
"My Day (Will Come)" - 1:53†
(8-Track Demo, Bearsville, NY, February 1997)
"Sleeping Beauty" - 3:22*
(8-Track Demo, Bearsville, NY, November 1997)
"Doctors Are Dead" - 5:34*
(8-Track Demo, Stealth Studio, October 1998)
"Comfortably Bummed" - 3:57*
(8-Track Demo, Stealth Studio, October 1998)
"No Inspiration" - 3:08*
(8-Track Demo, Stealth Studio, October 1998)
"Keep It Close To Me" - 3:49*
(4-Track Demo, Stealth Studio, 1999)
"Extra-Sensory" - 3:14*
(4-Track Demo, Stealth Studio, 1999)
"I Am Incinerator" - 3:02*
(8-track Demo, Stealth Studio, 1999)
"Relocate My Satellites" - 4:14*
(4-Track Demo, Stealth Studio, 1999)
"The Rest Of The World" - 3:46*
(4-Track Demo, October 2001)
"Lighting The Way (Live)" - 3:24
(Live At The Exit/In, Nashville, TN, 6-21-03)
"True Believer (Live)" - 3:22
(Live At The Exit/In, Nashville, TN, 6-21-03)

* = previously unreleased
† = from the out-of-print Rock Soldier CD

Personnel 

Don Coffey Jr. – Drums, Mixing, Group Member
John Davis – Organ, Guitar, Piano, Pedal Steel, Bass (Electric), Drums, Piano (Electric), Vocals, Engineer, Liner Notes, Mixing, Group Member
Jim DeMain – Mastering
Robbie Dubov – Assistant Engineer
Brandon Fisher – Guitar, Group Member
Mike Harrison – Guitar, Vocals, Group Member
Brian Jacobus – Engineer, Mixing
Stewart Pack – Photography, Package Design
Tom Pappas – Bass (Electric), Group Member
Sam Powers – Bass (Electric), Vocals, Group Member
Nick Raskulinecz – Engineer, Mixing
Jamie Shoemaker – Engineer

References

External links
Superdrag at Arena Rock Recording Co.
Review in Amplifier Magazine
Review at Nashville Scene

Superdrag albums
2007 compilation albums
B-side compilation albums
Arena Rock Recording Company compilation albums